Thomas Monteith Hedley (5 August 1882 – 11 June 1960) was an Australian rules footballer who played with Essendon in the Victorian Football League (VFL).

Notes

External links 

1882 births
1960 deaths
Australian rules footballers from Melbourne
Williamstown Football Club players
Essendon Football Club players
Footscray Football Club (VFA) players
People from Williamstown, Victoria